Teclla (possibly from Quechua for eyelash; two-colored, or for 'with alternating colors') is a   mountain in the Chila mountain range in the Andes of Peru. It is located in the Arequipa Region, Caylloma Province, Lari District. Teclla lies northwest of Mismi and Quehuisha.

References

Mountains of Peru
Mountains of Arequipa Region